Sreekandapuram is a municipality in Kannur district, in the Indian state of Kerala.

Location
The town is located on the bank of the Valapattanam river which flows into Arabian sea.

History

Sreekandapuram was historically ruled by the Mushika Kingdom. During the 9th century, Ad malik ibndinar founded Mosques at Kodungallur and Madayi and came to Pazhayangadi(Sreekandapuram) travelling by the river and founded 3rd Mosque here.

Since the middle of 20th century,  people from Northern Travancore migrated here at places like Chempanthotty, Madambam, Chundaparamba, Alex Nagar, Kotturvayal, Karayathumchal etc. They were of different religions but most of them were Christians; churches, roads and schools were established here. Since then paddy fields and other related cultivation were present. But after the migration the face of Sreekandapuram has changed a lot. Different types of cultivation like rubber, coconut, areca nut, pepper, cashew nut, tapioca and can be seen in the hilly places and as a result small towns or markets were formed.

The travels of Abraham Ben Yiju, a Jewish merchant who lived in Mangalore in the 1130s and 1140s, included a visit to Sreekandapuram, which he knew as Jurbattan.

Administration
As per Madras Village Panchayat Act passed in 1955, there were 3 villages in former Sreekandapuram Grama Panchayat like Sreekandapuram, Nediyenga and Kanhilery. Shree Abdul Rahiman sahib , Shree M C Ramankutty Nambiar, Shree Kunhabiduka were the presidents of the respective village panchayats.

In 1960, Kerala Panchayat Raj Act came into existence. As per the act, this village panchayat formed into Sreekandapuram Grama Panchayat. There were 2 revenue villages in this Panchayat. In 1962, first panchayat election was conducted and Shree N C Varghese was elected as first panchayat president.

Sreekandapuram established as a Municipality on 1 November 2015 which consist of 30 wards. The municipal office is situated in the town, on the banks of Valapattanam River. The current Municipal chairperson is Dr.K.V. Filomina (UDF).

Sreekandapuram Municipality is politically a part of Irikkur Assembly constituency in Kannur Loksabha constituency.

Municipality Wards
Sreekandapuram Municipality is composed of the following 30 wards:

Geography
Since Sreekandapuram town is a flood plain, the low lying areas in the municipality are often prone to flood during south west monsoon. Sreekandapuram area was severely affected by 2019 Kerala floods and 2020 Kerala floods. Due to a land slide from Coorg hills, Kottur river overflowed and submerged Sreekandapuram town and the areas adjacent to it like Podikkalam, Kottur, Therlayi, Thumbeni,  Madambam and Chengalayi. The devastation affected severe loss to merchants and their business activities in the town.

Kerala Kalagramam
Kerala Lalitakala Academy has constructed an artist village (Kalagramam) at Kakkananpara near Sreekandapuram that facilitates artists to engage in creative works by staying here. The Kalagramam is named after Padma Vibhushan-winning artist K.G. Subramanyan. The facilities include art galleries, studios, auditorium and guest houses in the first phase.

Demographics
As of 2011 Census, Sreekandapuram Panchayat had total population of 33,489 with 16,186 males and 17,303 females. The sex ratio was 1069 women per 1000 men. Total number of households were 7,960 in the panchayat limits. In Sreekandapuram, 10.7% of the population was under 6 years of age. Sreekandapuram panchayat had overall literacy of 94.2% where male literacy was 96.9% and female literacy was 91.7%. 
Sreekandapuram Panchayat has administration over Sreekandapuram and Nediyanga villages.

Religion
The town of Sreekandapuram has a mixed population of Hindus, Muslims and Christian.

A popular Hindu temple in the municipality is the historic Ammakoottam Mahadevi temple. The temple was looted and destroyed by Tipu Sultan, and nothing remained of it but earth and stones covered by bushes up until the 1970s. The land on which it stood was owned by the local Muslim community leader, and when people living around the temple claimed to have witnessed the Devi's presence, it was handed over to local Hindu community leaders and a new temple was built.

This temple is said to be over 600 years old and is also said to have been destroyed by Tipu Sulthan. It was later rebuilt. It is one among the rare Lord Vishnu temples which face the west direction with 'vatta sreekovil'.'Punarprathishta Mahotsava' is celebrated every year in the first week of March.

Thrikkadamba Shree Mahavishnu temple was also destroyed by Tippu and it is under reconstruction now. LordShiva and Vishnu are equally worshiped here. Vayakkara KAVUis another important place to visit in Sreekandapuram municipality. It is one of the important ecological places in the area. Vana Sasthav is the idol of the 'kavu' and people pay their offerings there in high devotion.

Educational Organizations

 Madampam P.K.M College 
 S.E.S College, Sreekandapuram
 Vimal Jyothi Engineering and MBA College, Chemperi
 Devamatha Arts And Science College, Paisakary
 Government Higher Secondary School Nedungome
 Government Higher Secondary School Sreekandapuram 
 Marygiri Senior Secondary School, Podikalam;  from Sreekandapuram town
 Maryland High School, Madampam
 Sal Sabeel Public School Sreekandapuram (CBSE);  from Sreekandapuram town
 Mapila A.L.P School, Sreekandapuram

Transportation

Kerala state highway (SH 36) passes through Sreekandapuram town which connects Taliparamba and Iritty. The road towards the east connects to Mysore and Bangalore and other parts of Karnataka.

National Highway (NH 66) passes through Taliparamba town. Mangalore and Mumbai can be accessed on the northern side and Cochin and Thiruvananthapuram can be accessed on the southern side.

The nearest airport is Kannur International Airport of about  South.

References

Cities and towns in Kannur district